Bici bici or bicibici muhallebisi is a Turkish dessert. It is a very light dessert, typical of southern Turkey and the Mediterranean region in general, especially the provinces of Adana and Mersin, where it is especially consumed in the summer.

Production 
Bici bici is prepared with crushed ice, starch, and syrup. Once the starch is cooked in water, it is left to cool in a tray and then chopped. Then, it is flavored with the syrup to taste, usually rose flavoured, and is draped over ice, finally served with sugar on top.

See also 

 Dondurma

References

External links 

 Images of bici bici on Google.tr

Turkish desserts
Frozen desserts